Vestavia Hills, colloquially known simply as Vestavia, is a city in Jefferson and Shelby counties in the U.S. state of Alabama. It is a suburb of Birmingham and it is made up of Vestavia, Liberty Park, and Cahaba Heights. As of the 2020 census, its population was 39,102, up from 34,033 in 2010. It moved up from the fifth largest city in Jefferson County in 2000 to the third largest in 2010, behind Birmingham and Hoover.

History

Vestavia Hills is named for the  estate of former Birmingham mayor George B. Ward. It was situated on the crest of Shades Mountain in what is now the northern edge of the city. Ward's mansion at the Vestavia estate became a landmark in the area as soon as it was completed in 1925. The -story house was patterned after the circular Temple of Vesta in Rome, with dark pink sandstone walls encircled by 20 massive white Doric columns surmounted by a carved entablature. The extensive gardens, populated by statuary and peacocks, surrounded a smaller domed gazebo patterned after the Temple of Sibyl in Tivoli.

After Ward's death, the house, something of a tourist stop near the highway between Birmingham and Montgomery, was used as a tearoom and reception hall before being purchased by Vestavia Hills Baptist Church.  The church met in the temple like structure for several years before demolishing a portion of the building in 1971 to make way for a larger building; a central portion of the original building remains.  The local garden club moved the gazebo to a prominent outcropping closer to the highway, there to serve as a landmark gateway into the community.

The development of Vestavia Hills as a residential suburb began in 1946, when developer Charles Byrd planned a subdivision for approximately 1,000 people on the southern flank of Shades Mountain.  The suburb was incorporated as a separate city on November 8, 1950, and has since grown, by rapid development and annexation, into a thriving small city of over 39,000 by 2020.

Geography
Vestavia Hills is located at  (33.433057, −86.778894). The Vestavia Hills Federal Information Processing Standard (FIPS) code is 78552.

The city is located along U.S. Route 31, which runs north to south through the city, leading north 7 mi (11 km) to downtown Birmingham and southwest 4 mi (6 km) to Hoover.

Demographics

2020 census

As of the 2020 United States census, there were 39,102 people, 13,082 households, and 9,569 families residing in the city.

2010 census
As of the census of 2010, there were 34,033 people, in 13,388 households residing in the city. The population density was 1,753.5 people per square mile. There were 14,952 housing units. The racial makeup of the city was 90.4% White, 3.8% Black or African American, 0.2% Native American, 3.8% Asian, 0.10% Pacific Islander, and 1.0% from two or more races. 2.5% of the population were Hispanic or Latino of any race.

There were 14,952 housing units and 13,388 households, with a home ownership rate of 76.8%. The average household size was 2.47 and the average family size was 3.03. The Median value of owner-occupied housing units was $318,200. The median household income was $87,154 with 4.0% of the population below the poverty line. The per capita income for the city was $50,017.

In the city, the population was spread out, with 25.3% under the age of 18, and 15.3% who were 65 years of age or older. The median age was 41 years. 52.4% of the population is female.

Education

The high quality of the school system in Vestavia Hills has been recognized by the Wall Street Journal and other sources. It comprises five elementary schools, two middle schools, one alternative school and one high school, with a total enrollment of some 6,000 students. Vestavia Hills High School is known for the success of its math and debate teams, which have each won several national competitions. The schools' band and baseball programs have also received much recognition. The 2008/2009 boys' basketball team won the Alabama state championship in division 6A. Vestavia Hills’ wrestling team won the 7A AHSAA State Championship in 2016 and 2017, and holds the record for state championship titles in Alabama state history with 15 Wrestling State Championships. Vestavia opened its 8th school in August 2008, Liberty Park Middle School.

In Fall 2006, the Vestavia Hills Board of Education moved to petition the federal government to end the required desegregation busing of predominantly black students from the Shannon/Oxmoor Valley area due to overcrowding. The Unitary Status court settlement was federally approved in July 2007. Any students currently enrolled at any Vestavia Hills' school will be allowed to continue in the system until graduation.

Parks and recreation
Vestavia Hills is a large community that offers its citizens many open spaces for families to enjoy the day, participate in sporting events, and take part in community events. The city of Vestavia offers many club sports and the variety of sports is always growing. Right now, the city of Vestavia supports youth baseball, softball, girls and boys basketball, wrestling, soccer, lacrosse, football, flag-football, cheerleading, tennis, and swimming. These clubs use many of the parks and facilities offered by the city.

Wald Park is one of the biggest parks in the main part of Vestavia. The park sits on top of a hill right next to Vestavia Hills Elementary West and overlooks Vestavia Hills Elementary Central. The park includes many community areas such as the Vestavia Hills Swimming Pool, the Civic Center, and the Senior's Lodge. It is also a great place for kids and families. Wald Park offers five baseball fields, a walking track, a Community Playground, as well as a skatepark. The park is open every day from 5 a.m. until 9:30 p.m. Pets are allowed, but must be kept on a leash.

Byrd Park is a smaller local park, located next to Vestavia Hills Elementary East. It is a small area encircled by a walking path, and offers a picnic area and a playground for the children.

McCallum Park is an open area park offering only pavilions, restrooms, and a walking track. There is a large open field often used for picnics and family or community events. The park opens at 6:00 a.m. every day and closes at sunset. Pets are welcome, but must remain on a leash.

Liberty Park Sports Complex is located in the heart of Liberty Park behind the elementary and middle schools. It is home to nine softball fields, four youth fields and five adult fields. The complex also offers one football field and four natural grass soccer fields. The fields are the home to the local youth soccer club, Vestavia Hills Soccer Club. The fields open at daybreak and close at 9:30, except when events are going on. Pets are welcome.

Sicard Hollow Athletic Complex is an extension of the Liberty Park Sports Complex and is located on the road that runs behind it. Sicard Hollow is a growing complex that currently consists of a turf football and lacrosse field that double as soccer fields and an additional two turf soccer fields. Restrooms, concessions, score towers, and bleachers are available. There are plans to expand the complex to include an amphitheater, water area, dog park, and walking trails. Starting in 2016, the field will be the home ground for the Birmingham Hammers soccer club.

Cahaba Heights Athletic Fields are located directly behind Vestavia Hills Elementary, Cahaba Heights and is home to three youth baseball fields and one multipurpose field.

Notable people
 Spencer Bachus – Former U.S. Representative from Alabama's 6th congressional district
 Pat DuPré – Former top 20 professional tennis player; collegiate star at Stanford
 Eli Gold –  National sportscaster
 Chris Hammond – Major League Baseball Pitcher (Reds, Marlins, Braves, Yankees, A's, Padres)
 Josh Hancock – Major League Baseball Pitcher (Red Sox, Phillies, Reds, Cardinals). World Series Champion 2006 for St. Louis Cardinals
 Smylie Kaufman - PGA Tour member
 Rebecca Moore, Miss Alabama USA
 Michael Papajohn – Hollywood Actor, Producer & Stuntman
 Richard Scrushy – Founder and former CEO of the physical rehabilitation healthcare giant HealthSouth
 Don Siegelman – Former Governor of Alabama (D)
 Jabo Waggoner – Alabama State Senator, Senate Minority Leader (R)
 George B. Ward – Former Mayor of Birmingham

See also
 Vestavia Hills High School

References

External links

 City of Vestavia Hills website
 Vestavia Hills Chamber of Commerce

Cities in Alabama
Cities in Jefferson County, Alabama
Cities in Shelby County, Alabama
Birmingham metropolitan area, Alabama
Populated places established in 1946